The 2008 Detroit Lions season was the franchise's 79th season in the National Football League (NFL), and their 75th as the Detroit Lions. The Lions made history by becoming the first team since the schedule was expanded to 16 games to finish winless.

2008 was the third season under head coach Rod Marinelli, and the season began going undefeated in the pre-season and hoping to improve upon their 7–9 record the year before, their best since the 2000 season. However, the Lions instead suffered one of the worst seasons in NFL history, finishing 0–16 and joining the expansion 1976 Tampa Bay Buccaneers as only the second team since the AFL–NFL merger to finish a full-length season winless, and the first under the 16-game schedule in place from 1978 to 2020. The Lions gave up a franchise-record 517 points during the season, coming within 16 of matching the 1981 Colts' record of 533 points allowed. The Lions' 32.31 points per game allowed on defense is the third worst of any NFL team since the 1960s, bettering only the 1966 Giants (35.79 PPG) and the aforementioned 1981 Colts (33.31 PPG). The 517 points-allowed mark has since been eclipsed by the 2020 team, who allowed 519 points.

The Lions were mathematically eliminated from playoff contention with a Week 11 loss to the Carolina Panthers. Embattled team president, general manager, and CEO Matt Millen, who had served in those roles since 2001 was fired on September 24, 2008. Marinelli was fired after the season ended along with most of his staff.

To celebrate their 75th season playing as the Lions, the team wore a special throwback replica of the uniforms used in 1934, their first season as the Lions, for two home games. The uniforms had blue jerseys with silver lettering, solid silver pants, blue socks, and solid silver helmets (as helmets were leather back then). This replaced their black alternate jersey used in the 2005 to 2007 seasons.

While unique when it happened, the 2008 Lions' 0–16 record was later matched by the 2017 Cleveland Browns. Combined with the Lions' 2–14 record the next year was the worst two season record since the merger until surpassed by the Browns who had a 1–15 record in 2016, followed by an 0–16 record in 2017.

Season

Notable roster losses and trades
 RB Kevin Jones – Released on March 13 – signed with the Chicago Bears
 DE Kalimba Edwards – Released on March 13 – signed with the Oakland Raiders
 DT Shaun Rogers – Traded on February 29 to the Cleveland Browns in exchange for cornerback Leigh Bodden and a third-round pick in the 2008 NFL Draft. (The Lions selected Andre Fluellen with this pick.)

2008 Draft

Off-the-field issues marred three of the Lions' 2008 draft picks. First-round draft pick Gosder Cherilus was involved in a bar fight in Boston the previous July, and was sentenced to one year of probation, though he would go on to assume the starting offensive tackle role in Week 3 of the 2008 season, providing some youth to an aging offensive line.  Second-round draft pick Jordon Dizon was arrested and charged with drunk-driving six days prior to the NFL Draft.  Despite being drafted, military obligations prevented seventh-round pick Caleb Campbell from playing in the NFL until 2010.

However, among the Lions' later draft picks were Cliff Avril and Jerome Felton, both of whom went on to reach the Pro Bowl. Avril, who recorded 23 tackles and five sacks in his rookie season at Detroit, would go on to win Super Bowl XLVIII as a member of the Seattle Seahawks.

Staff

Final roster

Schedule

Preseason

Regular season
In addition to their regular games against NFC North division rivals, the Lions played games against the NFC South and AFC South according to the NFL's schedule rotation established in 2002, and also played against the Washington Redskins, and the San Francisco 49ers, who had like the Lions finished third in their NFC division in 2007.

Game recaps

Week 1: at Atlanta Falcons

With Jon Kitna the opening week starter at QB, the Lions began 2008 at the Georgia Dome against the Atlanta Falcons, with then-rookie QB Matt Ryan and Mike Smith in his first year as the Falcons' head coach. A pre-season poll on thespread.com said the Falcons were less likely to make the Super Bowl than the Lions.

In the first quarter, Detroit trailed early as Ryan completed a 62-yard TD pass to WR Michael Jenkins, while RB Michael Turner scored twice on runs of 66 and 5 yards. The Lions responded in the second quarter when rookie RB Kevin Smith scored on a 3-yard TD run, and QB Kitna completed a 21-yard TD pass to WR Roy Williams. This cut the Falcons' lead to 7 going into halftime.

In the third quarter, Atlanta continued its dominant start with a 50-yard field goal by long-time Bronco star Jason Elam, playing his first game with the Falcons.  Falcons RB Jerious Norwood proceeded to score on a 10-yard TD run.  Although Detroit replied with a 1-yard TD pass by TE Casey FitzSimmons, the Falcons sealed the win in the fourth quarter with another Elam field goal, this time for 25 yards.

Kitna finished the game completing 24 out of 33 pass attempts for 242 yards, two touchdowns and one interception (by Lawyer Milloy in the third quarter), getting sacked three times.  Calvin Johnson, sharing snaps with Roy Williams in his second NFL season, hauled in seven catches for 107 yards, including a 38-yard completion during the Lions' second scoring drive.  The Lions' main issue was their defense, especially their rush defense, which proved powerless against the strong Falcons RB Turner, who, in addition to two touchdowns, rushed for 220 yards on 22 carries.  Jerious Norwood proved as dangerous, rushing for 93 yards on 14 carries with one touchdown.  Overall, the Lions rush defense allowed 318 yards.

Week 2: vs. Green Bay Packers

Hoping to rebound from their road loss to the Falcons, the Lions played their Week 2 home opener against their NFC North rival, the Green Bay Packers.  For the second week in a row, they faced a team with a quarterback who was playing their first game as an official starter, this time being Aaron Rodgers, who took over after Brett Favre was traded to the Jets in the off-season.

Detroit started by trailing 21–0 for the second week in a row.  Packers QB Rodgers dominated the first half, completing a 9-yard TD pass to WR James Jones in the first quarter, a 2-yard TD pass to WR Donald Driver and a 29-yard TD pass to WR Jordy Nelson in the second quarter. Detroit closed out the first half with kicker Jason Hanson nailing a 38-yard field goal.

In the third quarter, the Lions started hacking away at Green Bay's lead, as Hanson kicked a field goal for 49 yards.  A sack-fumble by Rodgers was recovered by Dewayne White, leading to a 53-yard field goal by Hanson. Mason Crosby added to Green Bay's lead with a 25-yard field goal, and went on to kick another field goal for 39 yards in the fourth quarter.  Detroit kept clawing away at the Pack's lead, as QB Jon Kitna completed a 38-yard TD pass to WR Calvin Johnson, Johnson's first touchdown of the season. The Lions earned a safety when a snap to Packers punter Derrick Frost went high, and through the back of his end zone.

The Lions took the lead on another Kitna pass to Calvin Johnson, this time for 47 yards, and seemed poised for a win in their home opener.  However, Green Bay rebounded with several key defensive plays to reclaim the game.  Kitna threw three consecutive interceptions in the fourth quarter that led to scoring plays.  The first led to a 19-yard TD run by Brandon Jackson.  The second and third were pick-six plays: CB Charles Woodson returned one 41 yards for a touchdown, and safety Nick Collins returned the other for a 42-yard touchdown.

Week 3: at San Francisco 49ers

The Lions visited Candlestick Park in San Francisco for a Week 3 duel with the 49ers.  The contest brought the Lions directly against two former members who were part of the team in 2007.  Mike Martz had overseen the Lions offense as their coordinator the previous two seasons, but had been fired after a promising start ended with a 7–9 record.  J.T. O'Sullivan, the Lions' former third-string quarterback, filled in for both the injured Kitna and Dan Orlovsky for four games in 2007, including an overtime win, but became a free agent in the off-season.  Martz took the offensive coordinator job in San Francisco, while O'Sullivan became the 49ers' starting QB.

Detroit began the game trailing their opponent for the third week in a row.  In the first quarter, 49ers QB O'Sullivan completed a 6-yard TD pass to WR Isaac Bruce. In the second quarter, San Francisco increased its lead when RB Frank Gore scored on a 4-yard TD run. The Lions got on the board when kicker Jason Hanson hit a 44-yard field goal, but the 49ers closed out the half with an O'Sullivan completion to TE Delanie Walker for a 24-yard touchdown.

In the third quarter, Detroit scored first on a Jason Hanson 51-yard field goal. In the fourth quarter, San Francisco increased its lead when CB Allen Rossum scored on a 1-yard TD run. Although QB Jon Kitna completed a 34-yard TD pass to RB Rudi Johnson, this was as far as the Lions offense threatened the 49ers' dominance.

A combination of small detriments cost the Lions the game.  The Lions were penalized 9 times for 61 yards, only converted 14 first downs to the 49ers' 25, reached the 49ers' red zone only once (leading to the Rudi Johnson touchdown), and turned the ball over twice, the second a Dan Orlovsky pass intercepted by Justin Smith with 2:41 left in the game.

Orlovsky came into the game in relief of Kitna in the fourth quarter. Kitna, who was sacked three times in the game, sprained his right knee.

Week 4: Bye week – Millen fired

Matt Millen took the helm as Lions President and CEO in 2001, despite having no management experience. Prior to his tenure, Matt Millen played a 12-year career as a linebacker for the Raiders, 49ers and Redskins, winning Super Bowls with all three teams. After retirement, he worked as a color commentator and studio analyst for CBS, Fox and NBC, as well as Westwood One radio, before his hiring by Lions ownership.

Calls for Millen's firing originated as early as 2005, when Millen received a contract extension despite four dismal seasons and the firing of head coach Steve Mariucci.  The "Fire Millen" movement ranged from "Fire Millen" chants at other Detroit-area sporting events, such as Pistons games and WWE events, to angry Lions fan protests. Of lesser help was the fact that Millen was the second-highest paid General Manager in the NFL. Going into the bye week in 2008, the team accumulated a league-worst record of 31 wins and 84 losses.

On September 24, 2008, after the Week 3 loss to the 49ers, Millen was fired.  Martin Mayhew, Millen's assistant, took over as interim general manager. He would be retained as GM after the season ended, and served in the role until 2015.

Week 5: vs. Chicago Bears
{{Americanfootballbox|
|titlestyle=;text-align:center;
|state=autocollapse
|title=Week Five: Chicago Bears at Detroit Lions
|Road=Bears
|R1=3
|R2=14
|R3=14
|R4=3
|Home=Lions
|H1=0
|H2=0
|H3=7
|H4=0
|stadium= Ford Field, Detroit, Michigan
|time= 1:00 PM EDT / 12:00 PM CDT
|weather= None (Domed Stadium)
|attendance= 59,790
|referee= Scott Green
|TV=Fox | TVAnnouncers= Matt Vasgersian, Brian Baldinger, Brian Billick, & Laura Okmin
|reference=Recap, Game Book
|scoring=
First quarter
 CHI – Robbie Gould 37-yard field goal, 6:48. Bears 3–0. Drive: 11 plays, 34 yards, 6:37.
Second quarter
 CHI – Matt Forte 9-yard pass from Kyle Orton (Robbie Gould kick), 5:27. Bears 10–0. Drive: 7 plays, 25 yards, 3:56.
 CHI – Devin Hester 12-yard pass from Kyle Orton (Robbie Gould kick), 1:56. Bears 17–0. Drive: 4 plays, 80 yards, 1:58.
Third quarter
 CHI – Matt Forte 1-yard run (Robbie Gould kick), 11:17. Bears 24–0. Drive: 9 plays, 65 yards, 3:43.
 CHI – Charles Tillman 26-yard interception return (Robbie Gould kick), 10:10. Bears 31–0. DET – Kevin Smith 12-yard run (Jason Hanson kick), 7:08. Bears 31–7. Drive: 7 plays, 30 yards, 1:23.Fourth quarter CHI – Robbie Gould 45-yard field goal, 11:58. Bears 34–7. Drive: 7 plays, 42 yards, 3:32.
|stats=Top passers CHI – Kyle Orton – 24/34, 334 yards, 2 TD
 DET – Dan Orlovsky – 13/23, 97 yards, INTTop rushers CHI – Matt Forte – 15 rushes, 36 yards, TD
 DET – Kevin Smith – 8 rushes, 31 yards, TDTop receivers'''
 CHI – Rashied Davis – 6 receptions, 97 yards
 DET – Roy Williams – 7 receptions, 96 yards
}}
Coming off their bye week, the Lions played a Week 5 Black and Blue Division duel at home with the Chicago Bears. The first game after the firing of Matt Millen, fans who had previously called for Millen's firing either booed the team or left early.

The Bears put on an offensive clinic. After a field goal by Robbie Gould, a 9-yard touchdown pass from Kyle Orton to Matt Forte, and a 12-yard TD pass to Devin Hester, the Lions trailed 17–0 going into halftime. The onslaught continued in the second half, as Forté scored a rushing TD, and CB Charles Tillman scored a pick-six off Dan Orlovsky. Detroit's only score of the game came in the third quarter as rookie Kevin Smith scored on a 12-yard rushing TD. Another field goal by Gould added to the Bears' lead, a formality at that point. Rod Marinelli successfully challenged a fumble by Jerome Felton in the third quarter, review showing that Felton was down by contact before the fumble. However, Orlovsky was intercepted by Charles Tillman on the very next play.

Jon Kitna started the game for the Lions, but after a poor showing in the first half, Dan Orlovsky came into the game at QB. Both Lions quarterbacks ended up with injuries, Kitna with back spasms and Orlovsky with his ankle, after the game. The Lions only managed 185 total yards to the Bears' 425, and gave up 82 points in two home games, the greatest number of points given up in its first two home games since 1958.

Week 6: at Minnesota Vikings

The Lions traveled to Minneapolis in Week 6 to take on the Minnesota Vikings. Although the Vikings under Brad Childress would finish the season as NFC North champions, they struggled early in the season. After an 0–2 start, Childress benched his opening day starting QB Tarvaris Jackson in favor of veteran Gus Frerotte. The Lions, for their part, went to Dan Orlovsky for the start, as Kitna still had a back injury.

The first score of the game came with 21 seconds left in the first quarter, and cemented itself into Lions lore. The Lions benefited from a fumble by Adrian Peterson that was recovered by Dwight Smith, but the Lions began the drive on their own 1-yard line. After two incomplete passes and a timeout, on third down, Vikings defensive end Jared Allen broke through the Lions' offensive line and went after Orlovsky, who unintentionally ran out of the back of his endzone, giving the Vikings a safety. Despite the safety, the Lions took the lead in the second quarter, as Jason Hanson kicked a 40-yard field goal.

In the third quarter, Detroit increased its lead as Orlovsky completed a 12-yard TD pass to WR Calvin Johnson. Minnesota answered when QB Gus Frerotte completed an 86-yard TD pass to WR Bernard Berrian. However, another turnover by Adrian Peterson and an interception of a Frerotte pass by Leigh Bodden kept the game close going into the fourth quarter.

Although both teams' offensive struggles continued, a pair of controversial calls swung the game towards the Vikings' favor. Calvin Johnson, after catching an Orlovsky pass, but fumbled the ball after Darren Sharper and Ben Leber tackled him, and Leber recovered. Marinelli challenged the ruling, trying to argue that Johnson was down before the ball came loose, but upon review the play stood as called. The Lions held a glimmer of hope as the ensuing Vikings drive ended when Jared DeVries blocked a Ryan Longwell field goal. However, towards the end of the game, in a pivotal Vikings drive, after a Frerotte pass to Aundrae Allison went incomplete, Lions cornerback Leigh Bodden was called for pass interference, though his contact with Allison appeared to be minimal. The penalty placed the ball on the Lions' 26 yard line, and with time expiring, Longwell kicked a game-winning go-ahead 26-yard field goal.

Roster moves
On October 14, the Lions traded wide receiver Roy Williams to the Dallas Cowboys for first-, third- and sixth-round picks in the 2009 NFL Draft. The Lions had drafted Williams in the first round in the 2004 NFL Draft, his best season coming in 2006 when he made the Pro Bowl. The trade helped build the Lions' future draft potential, while the Cowboys paired Williams with Terrell Owens in preparation for a potential 2008 playoff run.

The same day, despite possible rumors he would be traded prior to the deadline, quarterback Jon Kitna was placed on injured reserve for the remainder of the season, due to chronic back pain stemming from a bulging disk causing a pinched nerve. Kitna expressed his displeasure with the move in an interview, saying the Lions used it as an excuse to make Orlovsky the starter.  The Lions eventually traded Kitna to the Cowboys on February 28, 2009, for cornerback Anthony Henry.

Week 7: at Houston Texans

In week 7, the Lions flew down to Houston, Texas for an interconference duel with the Houston Texans. In the first quarter, Detroit's slow start continued as Texans QB Matt Schaub completed a 2-yard TD pass to TE Owen Daniels, along with RB Ahman Green getting a 1-yard TD run. In the second quarter, Houston increased their lead as RB Steve Slaton got a 1-yard TD run. The Lions responded when kicker Jason Hanson completed a 54-yard field goal.

In the third quarter, Detroit began to catch up as rookie RB Kevin Smith got a 26-yard TD run, yet the Texans answered with Schaub completing a 1-yard TD pass to Daniels. In the fourth quarter, the Lions tried to come back as QB Dan Orlovsky completed a 96-yard TD pass to WR Calvin Johnson, along with Hanson nailing a 54-yard field goal. However, Houston's defense prevented any comeback from happening.

Week 8: vs. Washington Redskins

The Lions went home for a Week 8 duel with the Washington Redskins. This was the first ever regular season game at Ford Field that had failed to sell out by the 72-hour deadline and was, therefore, subject to local television blackout.

In the first quarter, Detroit trailed early as Redskins kicker Shaun Suisham got a 25-yard field goal. In what would be the first time in the season the Lions scored during the first quarter, RB Rudi Johnson got an 11-yard TD run. In the second quarter, Detroit increased its lead as kicker Jason Hanson got a 43-yard field goal. Washington closed out the half with Suisham getting a 47-yard field goal.

In the third quarter, the Redskins regained the lead as Suisham made a 45-yard field goal, along with QB Jason Campbell completing a 50-yard TD pass to WR Santana Moss. In the fourth quarter, the Lions' struggles continued as Moss returned a punt 80 yards for a touchdown. Detroit tried to rally as QB Dan Orlovsky completed a 17-yard TD pass to WR Calvin Johnson. However, Washington closed out the game with Suisham nailing a 42-yard field goal.

Signing of Daunte Culpepper
On October 28, the Lions discussed a contract with veteran quarterback Daunte Culpepper. He signed with the Lions on November 3 and played 4 games before suffering a shoulder injury.

Week 9: at Chicago Bears

Still trying to get their first win of the season, the Lions traveled to Soldier Field for a Week 9 NFC North rematch with the Chicago Bears. In the first quarter, Detroit trailed early as Bears kicker Robbie Gould got a 36-yard field goal, along with QB Kyle Orton getting a 5-yard TD run. In the second quarter, the Lions greatly responded with rookie RB Kevin Smith getting a 1-yard TD run (with a blocked PAT), along with QB Dan Orlovsky completing a 17-yard TD pass to WR Calvin Johnson and a 14-yard TD pass to WR Shaun McDonald. Chicago would respond with Gould getting a 41-yard field goal, yet Detroit answered with kicker Jason Hanson getting a 52-yard field goal.

In the third quarter, the Bears began to rally as QB Rex Grossman (who took over for Orton after he left the game in the second quarter with a right foot sprain) completed a 6-yard TD pass to WR Rashied Davis. In the fourth quarter, Chicago completed their rally as Grossman got a 1-yard TD run. The Lions tried to rally, but the Bears' defense prevented any possible comeback from happening.

With their ninth consecutive road loss, not only did the Lions fall to 0–8, but following the Bengals' victory over the Jaguars, became the only winless NFL team.

Week 10: vs. Jacksonville Jaguars

In week 10 the Lions went home, donned their throwback uniforms, and played an interconference game against the Jacksonville Jaguars. In the first quarter, Detroit trailed early as Jaguars kicker Josh Scobee got a 34-yard field goal. The Lions would respond as QB Drew Stanton made his NFL debut and completed a 1-yard TD pass to TE John Owens on his first NFL pass. In the second quarter, Jacksonville took a huge lead as RB Maurice Jones-Drew got a 6-yard, a 1-yard, and an 8-yard TD run.

In the third quarter, Detroit's misery continued as Jaguars QB David Garrard completed a 7-yard TD pass to WR Jerry Porter. In the fourth quarter, Jacksonville pulled away as Garrard completed a 10-yard TD pass to WR Troy Williamson. The Lions would end the game when rookie RB Kevin Smith scored on a 1-yard TD run.

Week 11: at Carolina Panthers

The still winless Lions next went to Bank of America Stadium in Charlotte, North Carolina for a Week 11 duel with the Carolina Panthers. In the first quarter, Detroit struck first as QB Daunte Culpepper completed a 29-yard TD pass to WR Calvin Johnson. In the second quarter, the Lions increased their lead when kicker Jason Hanson got a 40-yard field goal. The Panthers responded when QB Jake Delhomme completed a 15-yard TD pass to TE Jeff King. Detroit answered when Hanson completed a 56-yard field goal, yet Carolina took the lead as RB DeAngelo Williams scored a long 56-yard TD run. Later, Carolina RB Jonathan Stewart scored on a 22-yard TD run. The Lions closed out the half as Hanson completed a 27-yard field goal.

In the third quarter, the Panthers increased their lead when kicker John Kasay nailed a 29-yard field goal. In the fourth quarter, Detroit tried to come back as Culpepper got a 1-yard TD run (with a failed 2-point conversion due to a missed facemask call against Carolina), but Carolina pulled away as Williams scored on a 4-yard TD run. Losing this game eliminated the Lions from playoff contention.

Week 12: vs Tampa Bay Buccaneers

The Lions went home for a Week 12 duel with another NFC South team, the Tampa Bay Buccaneers. In the first quarter, Detroit struck first as QB Daunte Culpepper completed a 15-yard TD pass to WR Calvin Johnson. The Lions continued their early success as safety Daniel Bullocks returned a fumble 44 yards for a touchdown, while kicker Jason Hanson got a 38-yard field goal.

Although the 17–0 early advantage was the largest lead the Lions would obtain all year, it didn't even last until halftime. In the second quarter, the Buccaneers' RB Warrick Dunn got a 13-yard TD run, while QB Jeff Garcia completed a 36-yard TD pass to WR Ike Hilliard and a 24-yard TD pass to TE Jerramy Stevens.

In the third quarter, Tampa Bay added onto their lead as RB Clifton Smith returned a punt 70 yards for a touchdown, along with CB Ronde Barber returning an interception 65 yards for a touchdown. Detroit scored when Hanson got a 40-yard field goal. In the fourth quarter, only the Buccaneers scored when kicker Matt Bryant nailed a 48-yard field goal.

Week 13: vs. Tennessee Titans (Thanksgiving Day game)

Later that week, the Lions stayed at home, donned their throwback uniforms again, and played their 69th annual Thanksgiving Day game against the then 10–1 Tennessee Titans. It was the Lions' only nationally televised game of the regular season and the only one amongst the final six home games that wasn't blacked out, although the Lions needed a 24-hour extension to sell out Ford Field. In the first quarter, Detroit trailed early as Titans RB Chris Johnson ran for a 6-yard TD. The Lions responded with Jason Hanson kicking a 53-yard field goal. Tennessee answered with Johnson running 58-yards for a score, along with DE Dave Ball returning an interception 15 yards for a TD. In the second quarter, Detroit's misery continued as RB LenDale White scored on runs of 6 yards and 2 yards. Detroit ended the half with QB Daunte Culpepper completing a 2-yard TD pass to TE Michael Gaines. In the third quarter, the Titans pulled away as kicker Rob Bironas kicked field goals of 49 and 41 yards. In the fourth quarter, Tennessee scored two more times when Bironas nailed 45 and 43-yard field goals.

Singer Jesse McCartney performed during halftime.

As Detroit fell to 0–12, the 47 points were the most points that the Lions had ever given up on Thanksgiving Day. This also made 2008 the second successive NFL season to see a team start 0–12 after the Miami Dolphins in 2007.

Week 14: vs. Minnesota Vikings

Next, the Lions stayed at home for a Week 14 NFC North rematch with newly signed veteran quarterback Daunte Culpepper's former team, the Minnesota Vikings. In the first quarter, Detroit was on the board first as kicker Jason Hanson made a 25-yard field goal. In the second quarter, the Lions increased their lead as Hanson kicked a 23-yard field goal. The Vikings closed the half as kicker Ryan Longwell notched a 35-yard field goal.

During the first half, Moran Norris was ejected by referee Jerome Boger for throwing a punch at Minnesota's Napoleon Harris.

In the third quarter, Minnesota took the lead as RB Chester Taylor got a 17-yard TD run. Detroit responded with former Vikings QB Daunte Culpepper completing a 70-yard TD pass to WR Calvin Johnson. However, Minnesota took the lead again as QB Tarvaris Jackson completed an 11-yard TD pass to TE Visanthe Shiancoe. In the fourth quarter, the Lions tried to rally as Hanson made a 39-yard field goal. However, the Vikings pulled away as Longwell nailed a 50-yard field goal with 27 seconds left in the game. On the ensuing kickoff, Aveion Cason received the ball and returned it 25-yards to the Detroit 29-yard line. On the first offensive play, Culpepper was sacked by Ray Edwards for a 5-yard loss, with Culpepper spiking the ball on the next play with 2 seconds left in the game. For the last play of the game Drew Henson came in at quarterback for the Lions, but was sacked by Ellis Wyms to end the game.

Dominic Raiola was fined $7,500 by the Lions after flipping the bird at fans who heckled him during the loss. Raiola later expressed no remorse for his actions, expressing frustration at feeling like a doormat for criticism he felt singled him out for the Lions' ongoing woes.

Week 15: at Indianapolis Colts

In the last interconference duel of the season, the Lions traveled to Indianapolis, Indiana to take on the Indianapolis Colts. The Colts struck first when Dominic Rhodes ran in a TD from 1 yard midway through the first quarter. The Lions responded a few minutes later with a 51-yard field goal by Jason Hanson. With just under 6 minutes left in the half, Chad Simpson of the Colts scored a TD from 2 yards. Calvin Johnson of the Lions responded a few minutes later by catching a 33-yard TD pass. The Colts struck back with just under a minute in the half, when Dallas Clark caught a 3-yard TD pass.

The only score by either team in the 3rd quarter was a Jason Hanson 30-yard field goal. In the fourth quarter, Kevin Smith ran in a TD from 1 yard out. The Lions decided to go for the 2-point conversion to tie the score and were successful when Casey Fitzsimmons caught a pass for the conversion. The Colts responded with another Dominic Rhodes 1-yard TD run and put the game out of reach with a 31-yard Adam Vinatieri field goal.

With the loss to the Colts, the Lions became the third team after the 1976 Buccaneers and the 1980 Saints to lose the first fourteen games of a regular season. They were the last team to start 0–14 until the 2016 Browns also did so.

With their 11th straight road loss, the Lions fell to 0–14 and 0–4 against AFC opponents.

Week 16: vs New Orleans Saints

For their last home game of the season, the Lions took on the New Orleans Saints. Detroit trailed early in the first quarter as Saints wide receiver Robert Meachem scored on a 20-yard touchdown run and running back Deuce McAllister scored on a 2-yard touchdown run. The Lions responded in the second quarter with rookie running back Kevin Smith's 1-yard touchdown run. New Orleans answered with running back Mike Bell's 1-yard touchdown run, and running back Pierre Thomas's 2-yard touchdown run. The Saints then closed out the game's scoring in the third quarter with quarterback Drew Brees completing 6-yard and 3-yard touchdown passes to wide receiver Marques Colston.

With the loss, the Lions became the first team in NFL history to have a record of 0–15. They also became the second team to lose fifteen straight in a single season after the 2001 Carolina Panthers, who won their first game, then lost the remainder to finish 1–15. The 2008 Lions were the only team to start 0–15 until the 2017 Browns.

Week 17: at Green Bay Packers

In their final opportunity to avoid becoming the first 0–16 team in NFL history, the Lions traveled to Green Bay, Wisconsin to take on division rivals the Green Bay Packers, whom Detroit had not beaten on the road since 1991. The Packers struck first midway through the first quarter when Deshawn Wynn ran in a career long 73-yard TD. They made it 14–0 when Jermichael Finley caught a 3-yard TD pass near the end of the first quarter. The Lions got on the board in the second quarter when Calvin Johnson caught a 9-yard TD pass. At the end of the half, Will Blackmon called a fair catch as time expired, allowing Mason Crosby to attempt a rare 69-yard field goal. Crosby kicked it accurately but it fell just a yard short with the wind blowing against him. Before the game, Crosby also attempted a 64-yard field goal. Calvin Johnson scored another TD to tie it up in the 3rd quarter when he caught a 14-yard pass. The Packers responded just after the start of the 4th quarter with a 36-yard Mason Crosby field goal, and later with a John Kuhn 5-yard TD catch. The Lions responded less than a minute later with a Kevin Smith 9-yard TD run. The Packers eventually sealed the Lions' fate via a 71-yard TD pass caught by Donald Driver.

Allowing 31 points to the Packers brought the Lions' season total points allowed to 517. This is the third-highest point total allowed in a single season in NFL history, trailing only the 533 allowed by the 1981 Baltimore Colts, and the Lions themselves in 2020, when they allowed 519 points.

Aftermath
A day following the Week 17 loss against the Packers, the Lions fired Rod Marinelli after a 10–38 record as head coach.  Defensive coordinator Joe Barry, assistant offensive line coach Mike Barry, defensive line coach Joe Cullen, secondary coach Jimmy Lake, and assistant director of personnel Dave Boller were also fired.  Offensive coordinator Jim Colletto was demoted to offensive line coach, and eventually parted ways with the Lions in February 2009.

In the same press release, the Lions announced that, in addition to General Manager Martin Mayhew having the "interim" tag removed, Tom Lewand was promoted to Team President.

With their guaranteed number-one overall pick in the 2009 NFL Draft, the Lions selected quarterback Matthew Stafford.  As the Lions' subsequent franchise quarterback, Stafford set several dozen NFL and franchise records, including the most touchdowns in a game by a rookie quarterback during a Week 11 win against Cleveland in 2009.

Legacy
The 2008 season also marked the end of the "fifty year curse" that ex-quarterback Bobby Layne supposedly placed on the club when he was traded away a half-century earlier. The "curse" is considered a hoax, as there was no reporting of such a statement in 1958, and Layne himself denied saying it. (Even so, the phrase "the Lions will not win for fifty years" was grimly ironic, as the 2008 team failed to win even a single game'', let alone a championship.)

The Lions became only the second NFL team of the post-merger era to go winless without a tie in the regular season, and the first to go 0–16. The Lions ended 2008 having lost 23 of their last 24 regular-season games, going back to the previous season, and a total of seventeen consecutive regular season losses.

On the NFL Network's 'Top 10 Worst Teams of All Time', the 2008 Lions were placed at #1, with the aforementioned Buccaneers teams ranking as the second-worst team(s) ever. Dan Orlovsky's run out of the end zone for a safety during their Week 6 game against the Vikings topped the list of ESPN's Not Top 10 of 2008.

Calvin Johnson tied with Larry Fitzgerald for leading the league in receiving touchdowns, hauling in 12 in 2008. He went on to set an NFL record for most receiving yards in a season, recording 1,964 yards in 2012 and breaking Jerry Rice's previous record.  Johnson was also inducted into the Hall of Fame in 2021. Three players went on to participate in Super Bowl XLVIII: Manny Ramirez and Paris Lenon for the Denver Broncos and Cliff Avril for the eventual champion Seattle Seahawks. Practice squad member Jake Nordin was a member of the Las Vegas Locomotives when they won the 2009 UFL Championship.

Defensive end Corey Smith, who recorded an interception and a fumble recovery in 2008, went missing after his boat capsized off of Florida's Gulf Coast, and was declared dead on March 1, 2009.  The Lions retired his number 93 for the 2009 season in his honor. Guard Damion Cook died of a heart attack in 2015 at the age of 36.

The last remaining active member of the 2008 Detroit Lions was Don Muhlbach, who retired after the 2020 season.

Tight end Dan Campbell became the Lions head coach prior to the 2021 season. Jon Kitna was the quarterbacks coach for the Dallas Cowboys in 2019, reuniting him with former coach Marinelli, who was the Cowboys' defensive coordinator. Mike Furrey is now the wide receivers coach for the Chicago Bears. Drew Henson, who played for the New York Yankees prior to his NFL career, is now a professional scout in the Yankees organization. Dan Orlovsky retired in 2017, and is now an analyst for ESPN's coverage of NCAA and NFL football. Scot Loeffler went on to join the coaching staff of Urban Meyer at Florida, eventually helping Tim Tebow in his player development, and is now the head coach at Bowling Green. Strong safety Daniel Bullocks is now the safeties coach of the San Francisco 49ers.

See also
 List of winless seasons
 The Curse of Bobby Layne
 2017 Cleveland Browns season

Notes

References

Detroit Lions seasons
Detroit
Detroit Lions
National Football League winless seasons